This is a list of heavy metal artists from the formative years of the movement (formed between 1963 and 1981). For bands that formed after 1981, please consult the lists for each heavy metal subgenre. In the late 1960s, a number of bands began pushing the limits of blues rock into a new genre which would be called heavy metal.

In 1981, three of the "Big Four" thrash metal bands emerged (Metallica, Slayer and Anthrax), to be joined on the scene in 1983 by Megadeth.



Heavy metal bands formed between 1963 and 1981

See also
Heavy metal genres
List of alternative metal bands
List of black metal bands
List of Celtic metal bands
List of Christian metal bands
List of crust punk bands
List of death metal bands
List of deathcore bands
List of doom metal bands
List of folk metal bands
List of glam metal bands and artists
List of gothic metal bands
List of grindcore bands
List of groove metal bands
List of industrial metal bands
List of mathcore bands
List of melodic death metal bands
List of metalcore bands
List of nu metal bands
List of new wave of American heavy metal bands
List of new wave of British heavy metal bands
List of new wave of traditional heavy metal bands
List of post-metal bands
List of power metal bands
List of progressive metal bands
List of sludge metal bands
List of speed metal bands
List of symphonic black metal bands
List of symphonic metal bands
List of thrash metal bands
List of Viking metal bands

Gallery

References